Amba or anba (but also mis-spelled عمبة, أمبة, همبة) is a tangy mango pickle condiment of Indian-Jewish origin. It is typically made of pickled green mangoes, vinegar, salt, turmeric, chili and fenugreek. It is somewhat similar to savoury mango chutneys.

Etymology
Mangoes being native to South Asia, the name "amba" seems to have been borrowed, via Arabic, from the Marathi word āmbā (अंबा), which is in turn derived from the Sanskrit word āmra (आम्र, "mango").

History
According to the legend, amba was developed in the 19th century by members of the Sassoon family of Bombay, India, who were Baghdadi Jews. Iraqi Jewish immigrants brought it to Israel in the 1950s as an accompaniment to their Shabbat morning meal.

Variants

Iraqi cuisine
Amba is frequently used in Iraqi cuisine, especially as a spicy sauce to be added to fish dishes, falafel, kubbah, kebabs, and eggs.

Saudi Arabian cuisine
Amba is popular in the western part of the Arabian Peninsula, sold in sealed jars or by kilo. Eaten with bread as part of nawashef (a mixed platter of small plates containing different types of cheese, egg dishes, pickles, ful mudammas, falafel, mutabbag and offal) type meals at breakfast or dinner in the Hejaz.

Indian cuisine

Amba is similar to the South Asian pickle achar.

Jewish cuisine

The dish is found in Sephardi cuisine and Mizrahi cuisine. Amba has become very popular in Israel since its introduction to the country by Iraqi Jews in the 1950s and 1960s. Now one of the most common condiments in Israel, it is used as a condiment in sandwiches, as well as a topping for hummus and other mezzes. One difference with Israeli amba is that it is always made with unripe, green mangoes, which contribute to its more savory flavor as unripe mangoes taste less sweet. It is often served as a dressing on shawarma sandwiches, falafels, and usually on sabikh. and as an optional topping on falafel, meorav yerushalmi, kebab and salads.

In literature
Amba is also mentioned in literary works, mainly memoirs. In his memoir Baghdad Yesterday Sasson Somekh dedicates a whole chapter to amba. He uses amba to tell the story of the Iraqi Jewish community that had satellite communities in India and Southeast Asia. In the same chapter Somekh references another Iraqi, who wrote a short story about amba (Abd al-Malik Noori, "It happened on a Friday").

Khalid Qisthini, a columnist at Asharq Al-Awsat, wrote a short article on remembering the foods of Baghdad of the past. His article is titled "Talking about the food of amba and samoon, which characterised Baghdad of the past." He remembers that in his youth, school children would rush out of school to get samoon with amba from the street vendor, who, if generous, would add a little more amba.

References

Arab cuisine
Assyrian cuisine
Condiments
Kurdish cuisine
Iraqi cuisine
Jewish cuisine
Israeli cuisine
Mizrahi Jewish cuisine
Pickles
Saudi Arabian cuisine